Hans Niclaus (8 March 1914 – 3 September 1997) was a German basketball player. He competed in the men's tournament at the 1936 Summer Olympics.

References

1914 births
1997 deaths
German men's basketball players
Olympic basketball players of Germany
Basketball players at the 1936 Summer Olympics
Sportspeople from Leipzig